"Cellphone's Dead" is a song by American musician Beck. It appears on the album The Information (2006) and was also released as a single.

Composition
The opening bass synth riff has been cited as reminiscent in tone and rhythmic character of "Chameleon" by jazz artist Herbie Hancock from his 1973 record Head Hunters.

Music video
The music video was directed by Michel Gondry. It is available on the 2009 DVD compilation Michel Gondry 2: More Videos (Before and After DVD 1).

The video was filmed to resemble one long shot and employs Gondry's signature usage of special effects. In the black-and-white video, Beck walks into an empty house, tuning a radio to different stations, then sitting down in a chair, where he sings the song. Suddenly, the view of the city skyline outside morphs into a 2-dimensional humanoid figure, and the door morphs into a figure as well. As the video progresses, Beck and those two figures morph into each other, transforming into doors and skylines, while the apartment's radio and dresser morph into different forms, as well.

The visual effects were completed at Fly Studio.

BPitch Control remixes
A remix 12-inch single was released by Berlin-based label BPitch Control, featuring remixes by Ellen Allien and Ricardo Villalobos. These remixes also appear on disc 2 of the deluxe version of The Information.

References

External links

Beck songs
2006 songs
Music videos directed by Michel Gondry
Song recordings produced by Nigel Godrich
Songs written by Beck